Edwin Zurbriggen is a Swiss para-alpine skier with disability class LW1. He represented Switzerland at the 1984 Winter Paralympics.

He won the silver medal in the event and the bronze medal in Alpine Combination LW1 and Giant Slalom LW1 events respectively.

See also 
 List of Paralympic medalists in alpine skiing

References

External links 
 

Living people
Year of birth missing (living people)
Place of birth missing (living people)
Paralympic alpine skiers of Switzerland
Alpine skiers at the 1984 Winter Paralympics
Medalists at the 1984 Winter Paralympics
Paralympic silver medalists for Switzerland
Paralympic bronze medalists for Switzerland
Paralympic medalists in alpine skiing